In dielectric spectroscopy, large frequency dependent contributions to the dielectric response, especially at low frequencies, may come from build-ups of charge. This Maxwell–Wagner–Sillars polarization (or often just Maxwell-Wagner polarization), occurs either at inner dielectric boundary layers on a mesoscopic scale, or at the external electrode-sample interface on a macroscopic scale.  In both cases this leads to a separation of charges (such as through a depletion layer).  The charges are often separated over a considerable distance (relative to the atomic and molecular sizes), and the contribution to dielectric loss can therefore be orders of magnitude larger than the dielectric response due to molecular fluctuations.

Occurrences 

Maxwell-Wagner polarization processes should be taken into account during the investigation of inhomogeneous materials like suspensions or colloids, biological materials, phase separated polymers, blends, and crystalline or liquid crystalline polymers.

Models 

The simplest model for describing an inhomogeneous structure is a double layer arrangement, where each layer is characterized by its permittivity  and its conductivity .  The relaxation time for such an arrangement is given by
. 
Importantly, since the materials' conductivities are in general frequency dependent, this shows that the double layer composite generally has a frequency dependent relaxation time even if the individual layers are characterized by frequency independent permittivities.

A more sophisticated model for treating interfacial polarization was developed by Maxwell , and later generalized by Wagner  and Sillars. Certain European text books will represent the  constant with the Greek letter ω (Omega), sometimes referred to as Doyle's constant.

References

See also 

 Debye relaxation
 Dielectric dispersion
 Dielectric function
 Dielectrophoresis
 Dipole
 Permittivity
 Ellipsometry
Linear response function
Kramers–Kronig relation
Green–Kubo relations

Spectroscopy
Electric and magnetic fields in matter